Karma Pakshi (1204/6–1283) was the 2nd Gyalwa Karmapa. He was a child prodigy who had already acquired a broad understanding of Dharma philosophy and meditation by the age of ten. His teacher, Pomdrakpa, had received the full Kagyu transmission from Drogon Rechen, the first Karmapa's spiritual heir. Pomdrakpa realized, through certain very clear visions, that the child in his charge was the reincarnation of Dusum Khyenpa, as indicated in the letter given to Drogon Rechen.

The young Karma Pakshi is said to have assimilated the deepest teachings effortlessly and required only one reading of a text to be familiar with it as he was already enlightened. Nevertheless, Pomdrakpa made a point of formally passing on all the teachings through the traditional empowerments, so that the stream of the empowerment lineage would be unbroken. This has been the case ever since: despite their innate clarity, young Karmapas receive all the transmissions formally.

The second Karmapa spent much of the first half of his life in meditation retreat. He also visited and restored the monasteries established by the first Karmapa and is famous for having introduced to the Tibetan people communal chanting of the Om mani padme hung mantra of compassion.

At the age of forty-seven he set out on a three-year journey to China, in response to an invitation from Kublai, grandson of Genghis Khan. While there, he is said to have performed many spectacular miracles and played an important role as a peacemaker. Although requested to reside there permanently, he declined, not wishing to be the cause of sectarian conflicts with the Sakyapas, whose influence was strong in China at that time. (There is an independent western reference to his presence in the court of Kublai Khan in The Travels of Marco Polo). Over the next ten years the Karmapa travelled widely in China, Mongolia, and Tibet and became famous as a teacher. He was particularly honoured by Möngke Khan, Kublai's brother, who ruled at that time and whom the Karmapa recognised as a former disciple. After Mönke's death, Kublai became the Khan. He established the city of Cambalu, the site of present-day Beijing, from which he ruled a vast empire stretching as far as Burma, Korea, and Tibet. However, he bore a grudge against the Karmapa, who had refused his invitation to remain in China some years before and had been so close to his brother. He ordered his arrest.

The legend tells that each attempt to capture, or even kill, the Karmapa was thwarted by the latter's miracles. At one point the Karmapa 'froze' a battalion of 37,000 soldiers on the spot, by using the power of mudra, yet all the time showing compassion. He eventually let himself be captured and put in exile, knowing that his miracles and compassion would eventually lead to Kublai Khan having a change of heart which did in fact happen. Returning to Tibet towards the end of his life, he had an enormous (sixteen-meter) statue of the Buddha built at Tsurphu Monastery, to fulfill a dream he had had long before. The finished work was slightly tilted; it is said that Karma Pakshi straightened it by sitting first in the same tilted posture as the statue and then righting himself. The statue moved as he moved. Before dying, he told his main disciple, Urgyenpa, details concerning the next Karmapa's birth.

This text is based on the abstract from Ken Holmes book Karmapa  on  the web site  used with the author's permission.

References
 
 Ken Holmes, Karmapa, Altea Publishing 1995, . Author's website
 Lama Kunsang, Lama Pemo, Marie Aubèle (2012). History of the Karmapas: The Odyssey of the Tibetan Masters with the Black Crown. Snow Lion Publications, Ithaca, New York. .

External resource
 An Introduction to the Life of Karma Pakshi (1204/6-1283), by Charles Manson, Bodleian Library Tibetan subject consultant librarian. Bulletin of Tibetology

 "The Second Karmapa, Karma Pakshi: Tibetan Mahasiddha" by Charles Manson.
Recording at Library of Congress, Washington DC, of Charles Manson on "Karma Pakshi and Two Mongol Emperors: Genesis of the Reincarnate Lamas Tradition". Recorded 11th January 2023.

2
1204 births
1283 deaths
13th-century lamas
13th-century Tibetan people